Per Hellmyrs (born 18 March 1983) is a Swedish professional bandy player who is a creative midfielder.

Career

Club career
Hellmyrs was brought up by Edsbyns IF and has represented their senior team, the Russian club Raketa, Swedish club Bollnäs and Russian club Dynamo Moscow. He is one of only few players, who have gone from representing Edsbyn to representing Bollnäs, two clubs with a traditional rivalry between them.

International career
Hellmyrs was part of Swedish World Champions teams of 2005, 2009, 2010, 2012, and 2017.

Honours

International
 Sweden
 Bandy World Championship: 2005, 2009, 2010, 2012, 2017

National
 Man of the Year in Swedish Bandy, 2009
 Swedish Champion, 5 (2004, 2005, 2006, 2007, 2008, all with Edsbyn)
 Russian Champion, 1 (2013, with Dynamo Moscow)

References

External links
 
 

1983 births
Living people
Swedish bandy players
Edsbyns IF players
Dynamo Kazan players
Bollnäs GIF players
Dynamo Moscow players
Expatriate bandy players in Russia
Sweden international bandy players
Bandy World Championship-winning players